Passabe, officially Passabe Administrative Post, is an administrative post (and was formerly a subdistrict) in the Oecusse municipality and Special Administrative Region (SAR) of East Timor, which is an exclave surrounded on three sides by Indonesian West Timor. Its seat or administrative centre is the suco of Abani. In the 2004 census it had a population of 7,531 people in 1,153 households. Passabe is a small village (sulo) in the administrative post, very near the Indonesian border. It was the site of a massacre of East Timorese by pro-Indonesia militias in the follow-up to the 1999 referendum for East Timor's independence.

References

External links 

Administrative posts of East Timor
Oecusse